Joh. Seb. Bach's Werke is the Bach Gesellschaft's collected edition of Johann Sebastian Bach's compositions, published in 61 volumes in the second half of the 19th century. The series is also known as Bach-Gesellschaft edition (BGA). It is also referred to as Bach-Gesamtausgabe (BG). It is a German-language edition: title pages and notes by editors are exclusively in German.

A supplemental volume was published in 1926, quarter of a century after the Bach Gesellschaft's dissolution. Another late addition to the series was Max Schneider's 1935 revision of the fourth volume. All volumes, including the 20th-century additions, were published by Breitkopf & Härtel. As complete edition of Bach's works it was succeeded by the New Bach Edition, published from 1954 to 2007.

Volumes
The Year (Yr.) in the second column refers to the volume's date of publication, that is the date of the editor's  ('Preface') if different from the date on the title page.

Reception

Gustav Mahler owned 59 of the 61 volumes of the Bach-Gesamtausgabe, and used them for his arrangements of some of Bach's compositions.

References

Sources

External links
 
 

Bach
Publications of compositions by Johann Sebastian Bach